Mérouane Debbah is a researcher, educator and technology entrepreneur. He is a full professor at CentraleSupélec and Adjunct Professor at Mohamed bin Zayed University of Artificial Intelligence. Over his career, he has founded  several public and industrial research centers,  start-ups and is now Chief Researcher at the Technology Innovation Institute in Abu Dhabi. He is a frequent keynote speaker at international events in the field of telecommunication and AI.  His research has been lying at the interface of fundamental mathematics, algorithms, statistics, information and communication sciences with a special focus on random matrix theory and learning algorithms. In the Communication field, he has been at the heart of the development of  small cells (4G), Massive MIMO (5G) and Large Intelligent Surfaces (6G) technologies. In the AI field, he is known for his work on distributed AI systems for networks as well as large scale AI models. He received multiple distinctions for his contributions to both fields.

Biography
A former student in Algeria of  Lycée Cheikh Bouamama (ex-Descartes, Algiers) and Lycée Henri IV (Paris), Mérouane Debbah entered the École normale supérieure Paris-Saclay in 1996 and obtained his PhD degree in 2002. His Phd thesis focused on a mathematical framework called free probability theory for the design of  wireless networks. He started his career at Motorola Labs in Saclay in 1999. He joined the Telecommunication Research Center of Vienna in 2002 as a senior researcher (ftw.). From 2003 to 2007, he was an assistant professor at  Eurecom in Sophia-Antipolis. His work focused mainly on the mathematical foundations of communication networks with the development of random matrix theory methods and game theory methods for signal processing and wireless communications. In 2007, he was appointed  full professor at CentraleSupélec (campus of Gif-sur-Yvette) at the   age of 31. At the same time, he founded and was director of the Alcatel-Lucent chair on Flexible Radio. This was the first industrial chair in telecommunication in France with close ties between CentraleSupélec and Bell Labs. The chair was at the heart of the  development of the small cells and Massive MIMO technologies. The chair focused also on training top scientists and formed more than 45 Phd and Post-doc researchers, many of which have become leaders in the wireless communication society. By 2017, the telecommunication department of  CentraleSupélec was ranked number one in France and number 2 in Europe. During that period, the European Commission awarded him an ERC (European Research Council) grant on random complex networks and an ERC POC (Proof of Concept) on Wireless Edge Caching.

In 2014, he joined Huawei and founded the Huawei Mathematical and Algorithmic Sciences Lab in Boulogne-Billancourt, with a special focus on mathematical sciences applied to wireless, optical and  networking communications.
R&D in the field of communication networks. The initial focus of the lab on 5G and polar codes  was a  massive win for the company, which had built up a significant patents position in the domain. In 2019, in order to  encourage more fundamental research and push the actual fundamental limits of the ICT industry,  he founded the Lagrange Mathematics and Computing Research center in Paris. The research center focused on the promotion of  fundamental research on the foundations of Mathematics of Computing and Data Science, as well as to expand the horizons of the field by exploring other scientific disciplines through a computational and mathematics lens. The center, which hosted several Medal Fields, was built on a unique innovative structure model for industry, based on open long term research grants that support pioneering projects for top scientists. In 2021, he joined the new  Technology Innovation Institute in Abu Dhabi which aims to bring together top tier talent from across the globe to research and develop disruptive technological innovations for the benefit of science, the economy and the environment. He founded the AI and Digital Science Research Center with a focus on AI, Telecommunications and Cyber-Security. By 2023, the center had nearly 80 researchers. Among major achievements, the center was pioneer  for the development of Large Language Models  (with NOOR being  the first  World’s Largest Arabic NLP Model in 2021 and Falcon LLM, one of the largest language models in the world developed in 2023) as well as leading the development of 6G core technologies in the middle east (with the first 6G multi-reflector LIS trial).

Awards and honors

 SEE Blondel Medal (2020), IEEE/SEE Glavieux Prize Award (2011)
 IEEE Radio Communications Committee Technical Recognition Award (2019)
 Louis Bachelier Fellow (2021), AAIA Fellow (2021), Eurasip Fellow (2021), SEE Membre émérite (2018), IEEE Fellow (2015), WWRF Fellow (2008)

His papers have received more than 30 awards, among which:
 2022 IEEE Communications Society Outstanding Paper Award
 2021 IEEE Marconi Prize Paper Award
 2021 EURASIP Best Paper Award 
 2019 IEEE Communications Society Young Author Best Paper Award
 2018 IEEE Marconi Prize Paper Award
 2017 EURASIP Best Paper Award
 2016 IEEE Communications Society Best Tutorial Paper Award
 2015 IEEE Communications Society Leonard G. Abraham Prize
 2015 IEEE Communications Society Fred W. Ellersick Prize

References

External links
 Merouane Debbah profile at Paris-Saclay University
 Huawei opens Mathematics Research Center to drive ICT innovation
 Biography on Who's Who

1975 births
Living people
Place of birth missing (living people)
French telecommunications engineers